Turtle Group is a national park in Queensland, Australia, 1,634 km northwest of Brisbane.

See also 

 Protected areas of Queensland

References 

National parks of Far North Queensland
Protected areas established in 1939
1939 establishments in Australia